Peter Marginter (26 October 1934 in Vienna – 10 February 2008 there) was an Austrian author, essayist and translator.

Biography
Peter Marginter studied law and political science in Innsbruck and Vienna.

Works
 Der Baron und die Fische, 1966
 Der tote Onkel, 1967, 1981 filmed by Georg Lhotsky
 Leichenschmaus, 1969
 Der Sammlersammler, 1971
 Königrufen, 1973
 Pim, 1973
 Wolkenreiter und Sohn, 1977
 Zu den schönen Aussichten, 1978
 Die drei Botschafter, 1980
 Wolkenreiter & Sohn, 1982, Drehbuch, filmed by Sepp Strubel
 Das Rettungslos, 1983, filmed by  Georg Madeja and Peter Bongartz, Christine Ostermayer, Wilfried Baasner
 Die göttliche Rosl
 Der Kopfstand des Antipoden, 1985
 Besuch, 1987
 Die Maschine, 2000
 Das Röhren der Hirsche, 2001
 Des Kaisers neue Maus, 2001

Honours and awards
 1967: Literature Promotion Prize of Theodor Körner Foundation Fund for the Promotion of Science and Art
 1968: Prize of the city of Vienna for literature
 1968: Funding contribution of the Vienna Art Fund of the Central Savings Bank in Vienna for literature
 1970: Anton Wildgans Prize
 1973: Merit Award of Lower Austria for literature
 1985: Price of the Inklings Society of Literature and Aesthetics
 1986: Translators premium of the Federal Ministry of Education and Arts
 1996: Austrian Cross of Honour for Science and Art, 1st class

Notes

External links
 
 
 "Peter Marginter ist tot", Der Standard, 11 February 2008

1934 births
2008 deaths
Writers from Vienna
Anton Wildgans Prize winners
Recipients of the Austrian Cross of Honour for Science and Art, 1st class
Austrian science fiction writers